Shin Jung-hwan (Hangul: 신정환; born 10 May 1974) is a South Korean singer and entertainer. He debuted as a singer in 1994 as a member of the K-pop group Roo'ra, and later became a frequent guest on South Korean variety shows. His career was put on hold for several years, and his popularity plummeted after he was found guilty of illegal gambling while visiting the Philippines in 2010.

Gambling controversy 
On 20 January 2011, Shin returned to Korea. He was indicted without detention for habitual gambling, violation of the Foreign Exchange Trade Act as well as the Passport Act.

Filmography

Variety shows

Korean dramas

Web series

Discography

Roo'ra

Country Kko Kko 

Country Kko Kko (1998)
Happy Christmas (1998)
Color of Chameleon (1999)
Carol Album 2 (1999)
Oh! Are You Going? (2000)
Winter Traveling (2000)
High Society (2001)
Perfect! It's My Style (2002)
Greatest Hits (2003)

Shinnago 

Project One (2004)

References

External links 
Official website

1975 births
K-pop singers
Living people
Rappers from Seoul
Singers from Seoul
South Korean Buddhists
South Korean male singers
South Korean pop singers
South Korean male rappers
South Korean television presenters